Fountain Bluff Township is one of sixteen townships in Jackson County, Illinois, USA.  As of the 2010 census, its population was 208 and it contained 110 housing units.

Geography

Unincorporated towns
 Jacob at 
 Neunert at 
 Raddle at 
(This list is based on USGS data and may include former settlements.)

Adjacent townships
 Kinkaid Township (north)
 Levan Township (northeast)
 Sand Ridge Township (east)
 Grand Tower Township (southeast)
 Degognia Township (northwest)
 Gorham

Cemeteries
The township contains 
Neunert Cemetery.
Goodbread Cemetery.
Boone Cemetery.

Major highways
  Illinois Route 3

Demographics

School districts
 Murphysboro Community Unit School District 186
 Trico Community Unit School District 176

Political districts
 Illinois' 12th congressional district
 State House District 115
 State Senate District 58

References
 
 United States Census Bureau 2007 TIGER/Line Shapefiles
 United States National Atlas

External links
 City-Data.com
 Illinois State Archives

Townships in Jackson County, Illinois
Townships in Illinois